Iceland–Mexico relations are the bilateral relations between Iceland and the United Mexican States. Both nations are mutual members of the Organisation for Economic Co-operation and Development, United Nations and the World Trade Organization.

History
Iceland and Mexico established diplomatic relations on 24 March 1964. Initial relations between both nations were limited. In 1985, Icelandic Prime Minister Steingrímur Hermannsson was the first to visit Mexico and met with Mexican President Miguel de la Madrid. Since then, there have been other high level visits by Icelandic politicians to Mexico.

On 1 February 1999, Icelandic Prime Minister Davíð Oddsson paid an official visit to Mexico and met with Mexican President Ernesto Zedillo. During his visit, both leaders discussed a free trade agreement between Mexico and the European Economic Area (which includes Iceland). Both leaders also agreed to work closely together in increasing trade, tourism, cultural and educational events between both nations and the Icelandic Prime Minister announced that Iceland would be investing more in Mexico, especially in the town of Guaymas, Sonora.

On 24 October 2007 Albert Jónsson, the Icelandic Ambassador to Washington, D.C.; presented his diplomatic credentials at the National Palace in Mexico City. After the ceremony, Mexican President Felipe Calderón and Ambassador Jónsson discussed the current state of Icelandic-Mexican relations. Both wished to strengthen bilateral trade and President Calderón wished for both nations to cooperate on energy and fishing rights.

In March 2008, Icelandic President Ólafur Ragnar Grímsson, paid a state visit to Mexico and met with Mexican President Felipe Calderón. Icelandic Minister of Education, Thorgerdur Katrín Gunnarsdóttir, accompanied the president and Iceland's first lady on trip. Also attending were members of the Icelandic Ministry of Foreign Affairs, and the Presidential Office, as well as a trade delegation. President Grímsson addressed the people of Mexico on 11 March 2008, saying:
In this new century, mankind eagerly seeks and requires leadership born of the same qualities, searching for solutions to the most fundamental challenge of our times, the threat of climate change, which is so evident in the melting of the ice sheets and the glaciers and the rising sea levels all over the world. Due to the Gulf Stream, Mexico and Iceland are closely linked in this endeavour. Flowing from Mexico into the North–Atlantic, the Gulf Stream encircles my country and constitutes the core of the conveyor belt of ocean currents which in every continent regulates the climate. Cooperation between our countries is therefore both urgent and is endowed with symbolic value, reminding us how all nations now share a common fate, but also demonstrating to others new ways towards solutions. ...

In November 2017, the Annual World Summit, Global Forum of Women and Leaders in Politics was held in Reykjavik, Iceland. A Mexican delegation attended the event led by the Mexican Senator María del Rosario Guzmán Avilés.

High-level visits
High-level visits from Iceland to Mexico
 Prime Minister Steingrímur Hermannsson (1985)
 Prime Minister Davíð Oddsson (1999)
 President Ólafur Ragnar Grímsson (1998, 2004, 2008)

High-level visits from Mexico to Iceland
 Senator María del Rosario Guzmán Avilés (2017)

Bilateral agreements
Both nations have signed some bilateral agreements such as an Agreement on Agriculture; Agreement for the Promotion and Reciprocal Protection of Investments; Agreement to avoid Double Taxation and Prevent Tax Evasion in Income Tax Matters and a Memorandum of Understanding to strengthen and promote bilateral technical cooperation in geothermal development.

Trade 
In 2001, Mexico signed a free trade agreement with the European Free Trade Association, which includes Iceland, Liechtenstein, Norway and Switzerland. In 2018, two-way trade between Iceland and Mexico amounted to US$23 million. Iceland's main exports to Mexico include: machines and equipment; control units or adapters; other fish preparations and preserves; and modular circuits. Mexico's main exports to Iceland include: frost or mist eliminators of the types used in motor vehicles; television sets for closed-circuit television systems; malt beer and animal fats and fish oils, except cod and shark. Between 1999 and 2017 Icelandic companies invested US$6 million in Mexico.

Accredited diplomatic missions 
 Iceland is accredited to Mexico from its embassy in Washington, D.C., United States and maintains an honorary consulate in Campeche City.
 Mexico is accredited to Iceland from its embassy in Copenhagen, Denmark and maintains an honorary consulate in Reykjavík.

References 

 
Mexico
Bilateral relations of Mexico